1949 Emperor's Cup Final was the 29th final of the Emperor's Cup competition. The final was played at Waseda University Higashi-Fusimi Ground in Tokyo on June 5, 1949. University of Tokyo LB won the championship.

Overview
Defending champion University of Tokyo LB won the championship, by defeating Kandai Club 5–2.

Match details

See also
1949 Emperor's Cup

References

Emperor's Cup
Emperor's Cup Final
Emperor's Cup Final
Emperor's Cup